Major D'Aquin's Battalion of Free Men of Color was a Louisiana militia battalion made up of refugees from Haiti, which fought in the Battle of New Orleans during the War of 1812. Its nominal commander was Major Louis D'Aquin, a white man, but its combat commander was Captain Joseph Savary, a free man of color, who had been a Lieutenant-colonel in the French army. The battalion distinguished itself during the American night attack of December 23, 1814, and during the main battle of January 8, 1815. After the battle Andrew Jackson praised the colored soldiers, and especially Captain Savary for their efforts. When the city authorities prohibited colored troops from participating in the victory celebrations, Captain Savary nevertheless led his men in the victory parade through the streets of New Orleans.

Background
Andrew Jackson issued a proclamation from his headquarters at Mobile, Alabama September 21, 1814, to the free people of color of Louisiana, regretting the United States government's previous neglect of the colored militia, inviting them to participate in the defense of the country, promising everyone who enlisted a bounty of 160 acres of land. He would appoint white officers, but make colored men NCOs. As a result, the old Spanish colonial militia of free men of color reappeared. Two colored battalions and a home guard company were organized.

Organization
The second battalion colored battalion organized was Major D'Aquin's Battalion. Its 256 men were recruited from Haitian refugees by Joseph Savary, himself a colored refugee who had served as a lieutenant-colonel in the French Army. They were placed under the command of Major Louis D'Aquin of the 2d Regiment of Louisiana militia, a white refugee from the same island. This second battalion was mustered into United States service December 19, 1814, with Savary as second-in-command with the rank of captain. There were also three other colored officers. The battalion was organized with one company of grenadiers, one company of chasseurs, and two companies of foot.

The battles

On December 23, 1814, British forces reached Mississippi River overland and took the Villeré Plantation where they camped. Several hours of hard close combat later, the British managed to forward enforcements and turn the encounter into their favor, but the British advance had been delayed enough for Jackson to fortify his line defense behind the Rodriguez Canal. D'Aquin's Battalion under Captain Savary played a leading role in the engagement, the captain encouraging his men forward with the words "March on! March on my friends, march on against the enemies of the country" in Haitian French.

During the actual battle, January 8, 1815, the battalion, with an effective strength of about 150 men, also was under the command of Captain Savary. It was stationed in the left center of the right wing of the US line of defense. To the right of them was Major Plauchés battalion of free men of color; to the left, 350 men from the 44th US Infantry. During the battle, the battalion made an unauthorized attack reaching the advancing British lines. Jackson always believed that the British commander, Sir Edward Pakenham, who fell in the battle, was killed by fire from a free man of color.

Aftermath
After the battle Jackson praised the two colored battalions, stating they had not "disappointed the hopes that had been formed of their courage and perseverance." Jackson specifically emphasized Captain Savary as worthy of commendation. Yet the general assigned the colored battalions to do fatigue works the white troops refused to do. Captain Savary, however, refused to let his men perform menial tasks, which were under the dignity of the white troops. When the city authorities prohibited colored troops from participating in the victory celebrations, Captain Savary nevertheless led his men in the victory parade through the streets of New Orleans. On direct order from Jackson, the colored soldiers received the pay and bounty promised them, but the government in Washington refused to act on the land grant of 160 acres also vowed by the general.

References

Notes

Cited literature
 Aslakson, Kenneth H. (2014). Making Race in the Courtroom. New York University Press. 
 Gates, Henry Louis & Appiah, Kwame Anthony (2005). Africana: The Encyclopedia of the African and African-American Experience. Oxford University Press.
 Kanon, Tom (2014). Tennesseans at War, 1812–1815. The University of Alabama Press.
Reef, Catherine (2010).  African Americans in the Military. Facts on File.
 Salter, Krewasky A. (2003). Combat Multipliers. Fort Leavenworth, Kansas: Combat Studies Institute Press.
 Sutherland, Jonathan (2004). African Americans at War: An Encyclopedia. ABC CLIO.
 Toledano, Roulhac & Christovich, Mary Louise (2003). New Orleans Architecture: Faubourg Tremé and the Bayou Road. Pelican Publishing Company.
 Tucker, Spencer A. (2012). The Encyclopedia Of the War Of 1812. ABC CLIO. 
 Wiese, Jason (2014). Battle of New Orleans Curriculum Guide. The Historic New Orleans Collection.

Battle of New Orleans
Military units and formations established in 1814
Military units and formations disestablished in 1815
African-American history of the United States military
American military units and formations of the War of 1812
Haitian-American history